Isetsky (masculine), Isetskaya (feminine), or Isetskoye (neuter) is the name of several rural localities in Russia:
Isetskoye, Sverdlovsk Oblast, a selo in Kamensky District of Sverdlovsk Oblast
Isetskoye, Tyumen Oblast, a selo in Isetsky Rural Okrug of Isetsky District of Tyumen Oblast